Le Grand Périgueux is the communauté d'agglomération, an intercommunal structure, centred on the city of Périgueux. It is located in the Dordogne department, in the Nouvelle-Aquitaine region, southwestern France. It was created in January 2014. Its seat is in Périgueux. Its area is 993.3 km2. Its population was 103,576 in 2017, of which 29,966 in Périgueux proper.

Composition
The communauté d'agglomération consists of the following 43 communes:

Agonac
Annesse-et-Beaulieu
Antonne-et-Trigonant
Bassillac et Auberoche
Boulazac Isle Manoire
Bourrou
Chalagnac
Champcevinel
Chancelade
La Chapelle-Gonaguet
Château-l'Évêque
Cornille
Coulounieix-Chamiers
Coursac
Creyssensac-et-Pissot
La Douze
Église-Neuve-de-Vergt
Escoire
Fouleix
Grun-Bordas
Lacropte
Manzac-sur-Vern
Marsac-sur-l'Isle
Mensignac
Paunat
Périgueux
Razac-sur-l'Isle
Saint-Amand-de-Vergt
Saint-Crépin-d'Auberoche
Saint-Geyrac
Saint-Mayme-de-Péreyrol
Saint-Michel-de-Villadeix
Saint-Paul-de-Serre
Saint-Pierre-de-Chignac
Salon
Sanilhac
Sarliac-sur-l'Isle
Savignac-les-Églises
Sorges et Ligueux en Périgord
Trélissac
Val de Louyre et Caudeau
Vergt
Veyrines-de-Vergt

References

Perigueux
Perigueux